Check the Technique: Liner Notes for Hip-Hop Junkies is a book by music journalist Brian Coleman that covers the making of 36 classic hip hop albums, based on interviews with the artists who created them, also providing a track-by-track breakdown for each album entirely in the words of the artists. It was published by Villard/Random House in 2007.

It is an expanded and updated version of the book Rakim Told Me, also by Brian Coleman, and it features a foreword by Questlove of the Roots.

Reception
The book received positive reviews from numerous press outlets, such as Entertainment Weekly, AllHipHop, ALARM Magazine, and The Onion/The A.V. Club.

Some criticisms of the book are that it is missing certain classic albums, is missing some tracks from some albums, that it has very few female artists covered, and "little attention is given to the outlining societal conditions."

Brian Coleman explained in interviews that he didn't intentionally leave any album out of the book, but there were difficulties in arranging interviews with certain artists. He also commented he wanted to focus on hip hop artists and what they had to say, rather than on academic subjects surrounding hip hop: "I don't really wanna read what critics have to say about the stuff. I wanna read what the artist has to say.” He added,

This approach has been praised by critics—URB commented on his "mercifully non-academic approach”, and ALARM Magazine said,

Sequel
Check the Technique Vol. 2: More Liner Notes for Hip-Hop Junkies was published in 2014.

References

Notes
Coleman, Brian (2007). Check the Technique: Liner Notes for Hip-Hop Junkies. New York: Villard/Random House, .

External links
Official website
Check the Technique on Myspace

Hip hop books
2007 non-fiction books
Villard (imprint) books